Thomas J. Fitzpatrick (born 29 July 1926) is an Irish former Fianna Fáil politician. He was elected six times as a Fianna Fáil Teachta Dála (TD) for the Dublin South-Central and Dublin Central constituencies.

A former publican and owner of "The Terenure Inn", Fitzpatrick was first a candidate for Dáil Éireann at the 1961 general election in the Dublin South-Central constituency. He was unsuccessful then, but at the 1965 general election he was returned to the 18th Dáil. After boundary changes, he stood in Dublin Central at the 1969 general election, where he was elected to the 19th Dáil, and returned again at the 1973 general election. After further boundary changes he stood again in Dublin South-Central at the 1977 general election, and was re-elected on two further occasions before being defeated at the November 1982 general election.

In the 21st Dáil, he was a Minister of State at the Department of Transport and Power and at the Department of Posts and Telegraphs, from July 1977 to December 1979.

, he is the oldest living former TD.

References

1926 births
Living people
Fianna Fáil TDs
Members of the 18th Dáil
Members of the 19th Dáil
Members of the 20th Dáil
Members of the 21st Dáil
Members of the 22nd Dáil
Members of the 23rd Dáil
Ministers of State of the 21st Dáil